Nembe is a Local Government Area of Bayelsa State, Nigeria. Its headquarters are in the town of Nembe in the east of the area at   The people of Brass, Nembe and Southern Ijaw Councils of Bayelsa State have bemoaned their neglect by oil companies operating in their areas.

They also lamented years of oil spillages that have destroyed their environment, aquatic life, as well as air and water pollution and called on the Bayelsa State Oil and Environmental Commission (BSOEC) and international communities  to come to their rescue.

History 
It has an area of 760 km and a population of 130,931 at the 2006 census.
The postal code of the area is 562. 
Much of the area of the LGA is occupied by the Edumanom National Forest.

Nembe is one of the major communities in Bayelsa State, Nigeria. Nembe people are found predominantly in the Nembe local Government Area and the ancient town of Twon Brass and Okpoama in Brass Local Government Area of the state. Nembe people can also be found within the coastal areas of Bayelsa State as a result of them being predominantly fishermen, traders and farmers.

The language of Nembe people is also called as Nembe (an Ijaw dialect). Every tribe that cut across the globe has it traditional law of dos and don't, the Nembe people are no exception. The killing of snakes is forbidden in Nembe Kingdom, as any attempts to do so often attracts severe penalty to the offender. The people of Nembe relate freely with Pythons without getting hurt or harmed by the snake species. Even the young ones are abreast of the historic linkage between the Nembe people and the python.

Masquerade Culture in Nembe

The masquerade culture of the Nembe people is inherited from ancient times. The masquerade culture is an ageless and ancient traditional practice amongst the Nembe people. The masquerade culture has retained its basic features, and have continued to colour the social and cultural landscape of the Nembe people. Masquerades appears in different forms and shapes and can perform in daytimes as well as in the odd hours of the night. In Nembe land, masquerade displays are commonly seen in festive occasions or period, and in burial of prominent personalities such as kings and chiefs. Also the Masquerade dance is common during coronation ceremonies. The Nembe  masquerade culture could be traced to a dance club called Sekiapu. Claims have it that  Sekiapu was founded in the 18th century by Meinyai Orugbani, the last son of King Mein of Nembe. He introduced the Sakiapu club which became a unified umbrella body of many masquerade from Kula, his maternal home.

List of towns and villages in Nembe LGA 
Nembe Local Government Area Consist of thirty seven (37) villages and towns, below is the list:

 Adukiri
 Agada
 Agrisaba
 Akakumana
 Allagaokiri
 Amasara
 Benkiri
 Dorgu-Ewoama
 Dumobi-Kumakiri
 Ekpeikiri
 Elemuama
 Enyumuana
 Etieme
 Ewokiri
 Fekorukiri
 Igbeta-Ewoama
 Ikensi
 Isaiahkiri
 Iseleogona
 Iserekiri
 Mini
 Nembe
 Obiama
 Obiata
 Odekiri
 Okokokiri
 Okoroba
 Ologoma
 Olusasiri
 Oromabiri
 Otumakiri
 Sabatoru
 Sangakubu
 Shellkiri
 Tengelkiri
 Tengikokiri
 Tombi

Notable people
Frederick William Koko Mingi VIII of Nembe

Climate

The wet season is warm and overcast in Nembe, the dry season is hot and mostly cloudy, the temperature typically varies from 72 °F to 86 °F over the cost of the year and is rarely below 65 °F or above 89 °F.

References

Local Government Areas in Bayelsa State